Ann-Ewa Karlsson (born 1 April 1955) is a former Swedish female high jumper. She competed at the 1980 Summer Olympics representing Sweden.

References

External links 
 Ann-Ewa Karlsson at Olympic.org

1955 births
Living people
People from Södermanland
Swedish female high jumpers
Olympic athletes of Sweden
Athletes (track and field) at the 1980 Summer Olympics